Darryl Alexander Duffy (born 16 April 1984) is a Scottish footballer who plays as a striker for Stranraer. He began playing professionally in 2003 and has played for sixteen different teams across a number of countries. He played for Scotland U21s in 2005 and Scotland B in 2005–2006.

Club career

Scotland
Born in Glasgow, Duffy made his debut for Rangers in a Scottish League Cup match against Forfar on 28 October 2003, coming on as an 84th-minute substitute for Maurice Ross. Two months later, 19 year old Duffy would make his league debut, in a 2–1 win over Dundee.

After rejecting an offer from Queen of the South, Duffy signed for Falkirk the following June. The then Falkirk manager John Hughes said that some "other clubs" from Scotland as well as from abroad were also interested in his signature. He scored on his debut in a Scottish League Challenge Cup against Ayr. In the following month, he would start his scoring with a brace against Montrose, finding the net in the 15th and 31st minute of a 4–1 victory. This would mark a start of nine goals in seven matches, and come the end of the season, Duffy would score a total of 27 goals in 44 appearances. His goal against St Johnstone would help Falkirk move to third place in the league table and Falkirk would end the season as the champions of the Scottish First Division, thus winning promotion to Scottish Premier League. He also went on to bag the Young Player of the Year award, along with the Young Player of August award.<ref>{{cite web|title=Bells Monthly Award Winners Season 2004/05|url=http://spfl.co.uk/news/article/the-annual-bell-s-awards-took-place/|publisher=Scottish Premier Football League|access-date=5 August 2015}}</ref> At the start of the new season, he was linked with a move away from the club, even though manager Hughes was optimistic of keeping him. In an interview to the club's website, he said "I've spoken to Darryl and he is fully committed to Falkirk FC." Duffy's first goal in the Premier League would come against Livingston. In the 2–0 victory, his 72nd minute shot would find the net, due to a deflection off Greg Strong. He would play a total of 16 matches, scoring nine goals in the top tier of the Scottish League until his transfer to Hull City.

England
Duffy joined Hull City on 10 January 2006, penning a two and a half year contract. Falkirk chairman Campbell Christie expressed his disappointment about the transfer saying that Duffy wanted to "develop" his career in England. Though BBC wrote that the transfer fee was £250,000, The Guardian'' said that he joined the club for an undisclosed fee. However, with limited opportunities at Hull, particularly after the departure of manager Peter Taylor, he joined Hartlepool United on loan in November 2006, scoring 5 goals in 10 games for the then League Two side.

An even more productive loan spell followed in February 2007, when Duffy joined League One side Swansea City on loan, scoring five goals in as many starts, as the Swans narrowly missed out on the playoffs. In July 2007 Duffy joined Swansea permanently, signing a three-year contract for an initial fee of £200,000.

Bristol Rovers signed Duffy from Swansea on 3 July 2008 for a transfer fee in the region of £100,000. Duffy scored twice in a 6–1 over Hereford United and in a 2–2 draw at Elland Road against Leeds United. At the end of the 2008–09 season, Duffy had scored 13 goals for Rovers. After this, however, Duffy's first team opportunities were restricted. He had a loan spell at Carlisle United where he scored once against MK Dons.

On 30 August 2010, Duffy signed a season-long loan deal with SPL side Hibernian to team up with his former Falkirk manager John Hughes. Duffy was ostensibly signed by Hibs as a replacement for Anthony Stokes, but suffered a foot injury soon after signing for the club. The injury meant that Duffy was unable to play for Hibs before Hughes left the club by mutual consent. Duffy featured infrequently after he returned from injury and Hibs announced in April 2011 that he would return to Bristol after the loan deal was completed.

Duffy was one of seventeen players released by Rovers in May 2011. Cheltenham Town announced in July that they had agreed to sign Duffy. The striker hit his first goals for the club in a 3–2 win at Northampton Town. He finished the 2011–12 season as top goalscorer with 15 goals. Cheltenham reached the League Two play-off final, but lost to Crewe. Duffy then fell out of favour at Cheltenham, making just five starting appearances in the 2012–13 season. He was offered a new contract by Cheltenham in May 2013, but he decided to leave the club due to his frustration at not playing regularly.

India
After training with Kilmarnock during the 2013 close season, Duffy signed for Indian club Salgaocar. Duffy scored the winner on his debut for Salgaocar in their 1–0 win over Churchill Brothers. Scottish striker scored 14 goals in 24 games for Salgaocar and won the Golden Boot in I-League along with Sunil Chhetri.

On 2 September 2015, he signed for Indian Super League franchise FC Goa on loan till the end of the season. Duffy left Goa in October due to hair line fracture on his shin bone.

During the summer transfer window of 2016, Duffy signed for Mohun Bagan from Salgaocar fc. He played for Mohun Bagan in the Calcutta Football League where he scored 6 goals in 8 matches. Duffy scored a brace in I-League against Shillong Lajong on 13 January 2017 and he was adjudged the man of the match.

Return to Scotland
Duffy signed a one-year deal with Scottish Championship club St Mirren on 10 August 2017. After finding it difficult to break into the first team, Duffy was loaned out to Scottish League One club Airdrieonians on 10 January 2018, for the remainder of the season. Duffy was released by St Mirren at the end of the season, and subsequently returned to Airdrieonians on a permanent deal in May 2018.

International career
He represented the Scotland youth team in the Victory Shield and won it in 1999.

Duffy was selected for Scotland B against Poland and Turkey during the 2005 Future Cup.

Career statistics

Honours
Individual
 Football Players' Association of India Foreign Player of the Year: 2013–14 (with Salgaocar)

References

External links

1984 births
People from Renfrewshire
Living people
Association football forwards
Scottish footballers
Scotland under-21 international footballers
Scotland B international footballers
Rangers F.C. players
Falkirk F.C. players
Hull City A.F.C. players
Hartlepool United F.C. players
Swansea City A.F.C. players
Bristol Rovers F.C. players
Carlisle United F.C. players
Hibernian F.C. players
Scottish Premier League players
Scottish Football League players
English Football League players
People educated at Linwood High School
Cheltenham Town F.C. players
Salgaocar FC players
Mohun Bagan AC players
St Mirren F.C. players
Airdrieonians F.C. players
Stirling Albion F.C. players
I-League players
Expatriate footballers in India
Stranraer F.C. players